This is a list of all the Intercity Express stations in Europe.

Germany 

From  the Deutschen Bahn AG, the Nederlandse Spoorwegen N.V. and the Société nationale des chemins de fer français operating high-speed trains with stops in several cities:

Other countries 

* There are some ICE connections inside of Switzerland which are operated between Basel and Bern(–Interlaken) or Zurich.

See also
Intercity-Express
List of Intercity-Express lines

External links 

 Travel information of Deutschen Bahn AG

Intercity Express stations
Intercity Express stations
Intercity Express stations
Intercity Express